Crowded Room may refer to:
"Crowded Room" (Christina Grimmie song), 2017
"Crowded Room" (Selena Gomez song), 2020
"Crowded Room" (The Academy Is... song), 2008
"Crowded Room", a song by XTC from Go 2, 1978